The tau neutrino or tauon neutrino is an elementary particle which has the symbol  and zero electric charge. Together with the tau, it forms the third generation of leptons, hence the name tau neutrino. Its existence was immediately implied after the tau particle was detected in a series of experiments between 1974 and 1977 by Martin Lewis Perl with his colleagues at the SLAC–LBL group. The discovery of the tau neutrino was announced in July 2000 by the DONUT collaboration (Direct Observation of the Nu Tau).

Discovery

The DONUT experiment from Fermilab was built during the 1990s to specifically detect the tau neutrino. These efforts came to fruition in July 2000, when the DONUT collaboration reported its detection. The tau neutrino is last of the leptons, and is the second most recent discovered particle of the Standard Model (i.e., it was observed 12 years before the discovery of the Higgs boson in 2012).

See also
 Electron neutrino
 Muon neutrino
 PMNS matrix

References

Neutrinos
Leptons
Elementary particles
2000 in science